Cinque Torri (sometimes named also Cinque Torri di Averau) comprise a small rock formation belonging to Nuvolao group in the Dolomiti Ampezzane (part of the Eastern Dolomites) north-west of San Vito di Cadore and south-west of Cortina d'Ampezzo.

Description
Cinque Torri, as all the other mountains in the area, are made of dolomite, with a particular pale grey colour. The group is formed by five towers (which give the name to the mountain) with a maximum elevation of 2,361 m (Torre Grande).
Every "tower" has its own name:
Torre Grande, the highest one has three very appealing peaks for rock climbers: Cima Nord, Cima Sud e Cima Ovest;
Torre Seconda, also named Torre del Barancio or Torre Romana;
Terza Torre, or Torre Latina;
Quarta Torre, formed by two blocks of rock with different height, respectively called then Torre Quarta Bassa and Torre Quarta Alta;
Quinta Torre, or Torre Inglese.

They are located in the south-west area of the valley of Cortina d'Ampezzo, north of the Averau mountain, of which Cinque Torri can be considered a part.

Summer and winter activities
In the Cinque Torri area there are the following rifugi (mountain huts):
Rifugio Cinque Torri, m 2,137 
Rifugio Scoiattoli, m 2,255

During summer it is possible to make excursions in the woods and on paths, among which are the Alta Via 1 of the Dolomites, the "Muraglia di Giau" (along the border between comuni of Cortina and San Vito di Cadore, with itineraries toward Nuvolau e il Passo Giau, and the historical path in the trenches of the World War I.

The towers also provide good and popular rock climbing with various routes at a range of grades up all of the towers.

In winter, Cinque Torri belong to an important ski area, whose tracks are part of the wider Dolomiti Superski area. They are thus linked to the nearby mountains Lagazuoi and Col Gallina. Until a few years ago it was possible to ski only towards Lagazuoi - Col Gallina - Cinque Torri, but beginning in the winter season of  2008–2009, it has been also possible to ski downhill from the Cinque Torri area to the higher area of Falzarego Pass by means of the "Croda Negra" lift and the corresponding track beyond Averau mountain.

History
This area was theater of conflict between Italian and Austro-Hungarian troops during World War I; countless testimonies of the fighting and of the war shelters built by the Italian army are present and have been recently rebuilt, to create an open-air museum with historical itineraries.

References

AA. VV.: Grande atlante escursionistico delle Dolomiti, Kompass - Fleischmann editori, Trento, 2004. 
Ardito, Stefano: A piedi sulle Dolomiti di Cortina, Iter edizioni, 2001. 
Dibona, Dino: Tutto quello che vorreste (e dovreste) sapere sulle Dolomiti, Newton & Compton editori, 2005.

External links
dolomiti.org
 Photo 360°: Cinque Torri, Cinque Torri
guidedolomiti.com Cimbing on Cinque Torri

See also
Dolomites
Cortina d'Ampezzo
Italian front (World War I)
Nuvolau

Mountains of the Alps
Mountains of Veneto
Dolomites
Geography of Cortina d'Ampezzo